Stuart Shadrick Murray (22 March 1898 – 19 September 1980) was a vice admiral of the United States Navy who served during World War II.

Early life and career
Born in Delia, Texas he graduated from the United States Naval Academy in 1919. In the 1920s, Murray was involved in constructing the submarine base at Pearl Harbor.

Nicknamed "Sunshine" and "the Gentle Giant", Murray was a plankowner aboard , placing her in commission on 15 August 1935.

As ComSubDiv 15, in October 1941, he was assigned to Manila, home of the Asiatic Fleet. They comprised the entirety of the brand-new .

World War II
When the Japanese attacked the Philippines, Wilkes (who ended up being "special adviser" to Doyle, who had no experience in Asia), his chief of staff, Jimmy Fife, and Murray warned their skippers to be cautious. The initial plan, to rely on information from General Lewis Brereton's B-17 aircraft, failed the first day, when General MacArthur failed to preserve them from Japanese attack. Murray was not aided by the abysmal performance of the Mark 14 torpedo, either.

As the defeat became evident, Wilkes ordered all submarine crewmen out; on 1 January 1942, Murray boarded Chet Smith's  with Wilkes and others, to join Hart in Soerabaja.

After fleeing the Philippines, Hart pulled Murray's boats back to Fremantle (in keeping with Navy Department instructions), where Murray came under the command of his old boss from SubDiv 13 Charles Lockwood's Task Force 51, becoming chief of staff of SubRon 2, under Jimmy Fife (also one of Lockwood's old Division 13 skippers).

With the death of Robert H. English, Lockwood was named ComSubPac in his stead, taking Murray as his Chief of Staff (replacing John Griggs), over the objections of "Chips" Carpender, ComSubSoWestPac.

Near the end of 1943, Murray was named Commandant of Midshipmen at Annapolis, rather than to a new submarine squadron. Among the midshipmen at the Academy during Murray's tenure were future president Jimmy Carter and future vice admiral and Medal of Honor recipient James B. Stockdale.

Murray took command of the battleship  in May 1945, and was responsible for the preparations for the signing of the Japanese surrender on 2 September 1945.

Post war
Murray was ComSubLant from 1950 until 1952. Murray was promoted to vice admiral (three-star) on December 7, 1955 and assigned as Naval Inspector General.  He retired in August 1956 and was promoted to admiral (four star) on the retired list in recognition of his wartime service.

Awards
Distinguished Service Medal
Legion of Merit
World War I Victory Medal
American Defense Service Medal with "FLEET" clasp
Asiatic-Pacific Campaign Medal with one battle star
American Campaign Medal
World War II Victory Medal
Navy Occupation Medal
National Defense Service Medal
Philippine Defense Medal

Notes

References
 Blair, Clay, Jr. Silent Victory. New York: Bantam, 1976 (reprints Lippincott 1975 edition). .

1898 births
1980 deaths
Burials at Arlington National Cemetery
People from Limestone County, Texas
United States Navy admirals
United States Naval Academy alumni
United States Navy Inspectors General
Recipients of the Legion of Merit
Military personnel from Texas